The Holy Terror is a Big Finish Productions audio drama based on the long-running British science fiction television series Doctor Who. It is notable for incorporating Frobisher, a regular character from Doctor Who Magazine's comic strip during the mid-1980s.

Plot
The Sixth Doctor and Frobisher become involved in a power struggle in a mysterious castle, culminating in a bloodbath. The Doctor and Frobisher finds themselves involved with a society which strictly adheres to a complex and apparently illogical set of customs. Drawing inspiration from the Shakespearean tragedy as well as exploring unpleasant elements of the father/child relationship and infanticide, this is one of the darker episodes.

This is the first Doctor Who audio story to feature Frobisher.

This episode addresses issues of crime and retribution, self-determinacy, religious extremism and custom.

Cast
The Doctor — Colin Baker
Frobisher — Robert Jezek
Captain Sejanus — Dan Hogarth
Eugene Tacitus — Sam Kelly
Berengaria — Roberta Taylor
Livilla — Helen Punt
Childeric — Peter Guinness
Pepin — Stefan Atkinson
Clovis — Peter Sowerbutts
Arnulf — Bruce Mann
Sculptor — Robert Shearman

Notes
 The initial "miracle" of identifying a randomly chosen card uses the 3 of Clubs – a reference to Penn & Teller's favorite card to use in such tricks.
 This is the first time that Frobisher, a companion that appears in the comic strips of Doctor Who Magazine, is portrayed in an audio adventure.
A short "music video" type cue can be found on a bonus track 4 minutes 32 seconds into the final track on Disk 2
The background to the CD cover is made up of the 1996 TV Movie TARDIS set.

External links
Big Finish Productions – The Holy Terror

Sixth Doctor audio plays
2000 audio plays
Audio plays by Robert Shearman
Black comedy plays
Absurdist fiction
Surreal comedy radio series
Horror comedy